George A. Walker (1860 – after 1888) was a Canadian Major League Baseball pitcher who played in  with the Baltimore Orioles.

In 4 games, Walker had a 1–3 record with a 5.91 ERA.

External links

1860 births
19th-century baseball players
Baltimore Orioles (AA) players
Baseball players from Hamilton, Ontario
Canadian expatriate baseball players in the United States
Major League Baseball pitchers
Major League Baseball players from Canada
Year of death missing
Worcester Grays players
Hamilton Hams players
London Tecumsehs (baseball) players
New Haven (minor league baseball) players
Montpelier-Barre players